The House Subcommittee on the Western Hemisphere is a subcommittee within the House Foreign Affairs Committee. It was known in previous Congresses as the Subcommittee on the Western Hemisphere, Civilian Security and Trade, and most recently, the Subcommittee on Western Hemisphere, Civilian Security, Migration and International Economic Policy.

Jurisdiction
The subcommittee is one of five with what the committees calls "regional jurisdiction" over a specific area of the globe. Such jurisdiction includes political relations between the United States and countries in the region and related legislation, disaster assistance, boundary issues, and international claims. The regional subcommittees also oversee the activities of the United Nations and its programs in the region.

Members, 117th Congress

Historical membership rosters

115th Congress

116th Congress

External links
 Official site

References

Foreign Affairs Western Hemisphere, Civilian Security and Trade